

Foreign aircraft accidents

Domestic aircraft accidents

Helicopter accidents

References

Aviation accidents and incidents in Nepal
Aviation accidents and incidents